Martín Cuevas and Paolo Lorenzi were the defending champions but chose not to defend their title.

Robert Galloway and Jackson Withrow won the title after defeating André Göransson and Nathaniel Lammons 6–3, 7–6(7–3) in the final.

Seeds

Draw

References

External links
 Main draw

Sarasota Open - Doubles
2022 Doubles